Alan Holmes Dent (7 January 1905 – 19 December 1978) was a Scottish journalist, editor and writer.

Early life
Alan Dent was born in Maybole, Ayrshire, Scotland, of English parents. He lost his mother when he was two years old. He was educated at Carrick Academy and Glasgow University, where he began to study medicine at the age of 16, but later switched to French, English and Italian. He left the university without a degree in 1926 heading for London.

Career
Dent approached the critic James Agate in the hope of becoming his secretary, and was appointed. He remained with Agate for 14 years. Later, in Agate's Ego volumes of diaries and letters, Dent was, according to John Gielgud, called "Jock".

During the Second World War, Dent served in the Royal Navy. Later he was the London drama critic of the Manchester Guardian and the News Chronicle. He became the film critic of the Illustrated London News and broadcast for the BBC's European Service. He edited the letters of Mrs Campbell and Bernard Shaw. He was text editor and advisor to Laurence Olivier for his three Shakespeare films as star and director: Henry V (1944), Hamlet (1948), and Richard III (1955).

Death
Dent died at his home in Beaconsfield, Buckinghamshire, on 19 December 1978, aged 73.

Selected publications
Nocturnes and rhapsodies. Hamish Hamilton, London, 1950.
Bernard Shaw and Mrs. Patrick Campbell: Their correspondence. Victor Gollancz, London, 1952. (editor)
My dear America. Arthur Barker, London, 1954.
Mrs. Patrick Campbell. Museum Press, London, 1961.
How well do you know your Shakespeare? Forty sets of questions and answers. Macdonald, London. 1964.
Burns in his time. Nelson, London, 1966.
Vivien Leigh: A bouquet. Hamish Hamilton, London, 1969. 
My Covent Garden. J.M. Dent, London, 1973. 
World of Shakespeare series - multiple volumes

References

1905 births
1978 deaths
People educated at Carrick Academy
Scottish film critics
Scottish journalists
Scottish non-fiction writers
Royal Navy personnel of World War II
Scottish people of English descent
Presidents of the Critics' Circle